Joy Baba Lokenath was Bengali daily soap opera which was premiered on Zee Bangla and digital platform Zee5. The show starred Bhaswar and Soumili in lead roles. The show went off on 4 September 2020.

Plot
It is a mythological story which revolves around the life of  Lokenath Bramhachary . This story shows how Lokenath became a great priest with the help of his gurudev Bhagwan Ganguly .

Cast
 Bhaswar Chatterjee as Old Loknath
 Souptic Chakraborty as Adult Loknath
Arannyo Roychowdhury as Young Loknath 
 Soumili Biswas / Srabanti Malakar as Kamala: Loknath's mother 
 Arindam Chatterjee as Ramnarayan: Loknath's father
 Rajesh Kr Chattopadhyay as Balaram: Beni Madhab's Father
 Geetashree Roy as Ma Durga
 Sohan Bandopadhyay as Gurudev
 Bidipta Chakraborty as Bhairavi
 Reshmi Sen as Sarbamangala aka Guruma.
 Rupa Bhattacharjee as Torita.
 Saugata Bandyopadhyay as Ram Prashad.
 Pradip Dhar as Beni Madhab.
 Rimjhim Mitra as Baro Ranimaa.
 Arijit Chowdhury
 Priyanka Rati Pal as Chhoto Rani Maa.
 Anaya Ghosh 
 Dipanjan Bhattacharya 
 Mousumi Bhattacharya 
 Titas Bhowmik as Sudha.
 Samrat Mukherjee as Keshav Chandra
 Laboni Bhattacharjee as Hemanlini
 Rohit Mukherjee
 Priya Malakar

References

Bengali-language television programming in India
Zee Bangla original programming